Guaranita is a genus of South American cellar spiders that was first described by B. A. Huber in 2000.

Species
 it contains four species, found only in Brazil and Argentina:
Guaranita dobby Torres, Pardo, González-Reyes, Rodríguez Artigas & Corronca, 2016 – Argentina
Guaranita goloboffi Huber, 2000 (type) – Argentina
Guaranita munda (Gertsch, 1982) – Brazil, Argentina
Guaranita yaculica Huber, 2000 – Argentina

See also
 List of Pholcidae species

References

Araneomorphae genera
Pholcidae
Spiders of Argentina
Spiders of Brazil